Michael S. Berman is an American Washington, D.C., lawyer and lobbyist.  He is the President of The Duberstein Group, a  Washington lobbying firm.

Berman is a native of Minnesota.  He came to Washington in the 1960s, as an aide to then-Senator Walter Mondale.  When Mondale became Vice President of the United States in 1977, Berman came to the White House as Counsel to the Vice President.  Berman then played a prominent role in  Mondale's 1984 presidential campaign.

In 1992, Berman became a confidante to President Bill Clinton and First Lady Hillary Clinton. He was a prominent advisor to the two during their tenure in the White House.  Berman has also played a major role in planning the Democratic National Convention for a number of years.

In 2006, Berman published an auto-biography largely focused on his lifelong struggle with being overweight, called Living Large.  Berman is also the author of a self-published newsletter called Washington Watch, which mixes political commentary with restaurant reviews.  Berman's restaurant reviews are unique for their discussion of the design of the restrooms in the establishments being reviewed.

References

External links

20th-century births
20th-century American businesspeople
20th-century American lawyers
20th-century American male writers
20th-century American non-fiction writers
20th-century publishers (people)
21st-century American businesspeople
21st-century American lawyers
21st-century American male writers
21st-century American non-fiction writers
21st-century publishers (people)
American autobiographers
American publishers (people)
American lobbyists
American  restaurant critics
Carter administration personnel
 Businesspeople from Minnesota
 Businesspeople from Washington, D.C.
Democratic National Conventions
Lawyers from Washington, D.C.
Leaders of organizations
Living people
Minnesota lawyers
Newsletter publishers (people)
United States congressional aides
University of Minnesota Duluth alumni
Walter Mondale
Writers from Minnesota
Writers from Washington, D.C.
Year of birth missing (living people)